Marr & Holman was an architectural firm in Nashville, Tennessee known for their traditional design. Notable buildings include the Nashville Post Office (now known as the Frist Art Museum) and the Milliken Memorial Community House in Elkton, Kentucky.

The firm was formed in 1913 with Joseph Holman (1890–1952) and Thomas Marr (1866–1936) as principals.

A number of their works are listed on the U.S. National Register of Historic Places.

Works include (with attribution):
East Nashville High and Junior High Schools (built 1932), 110, 112 Gallatin Rd. Nashville, Tennessee, NRHP-listed
Estes Kefauver Federal Building and United States Courthouse (1948–52), 801 Broadway, Nashville, NRHP-listed in 2016

Federal Reserve Bank of Atlanta, 226 N. 3rd Ave., Nashville, NRHP-listed
Franklin County Courthouse, Public Sq. Winchester, Tennessee, NRHP-listed
James A. Cayce Homes, housing project in East Nashville
James Robertson Hotel, 118 N. 7th Ave., Nashville, NRHP-listed
Lauderdale County Courthouse, Town Sq. Ripley, Tennessee, NRHP-listed
Madison County Courthouse, Public Sq. Jackson, TN, NRHP-listed
Middle Tennessee State Teachers College Training School, 923 E. Lytle St. Murfreesboro, TN, NRHP-listed
Morgan School, Built 1919 - Petersburg, Tennessee
Nashville Municipal Auditorium
Noel Hotel, 200-204 N. 4th Ave., Nashville, NRHP-listed
Obion County Courthouse, jct. of Third and Washington Sts. Union City, Tennessee, NRHP-listed
Pickett County Courthouse, Town Sq. Byrdstown, Tennessee, NRHP-listed
Rich-Schwartz Building, 202-204 N. 6th Ave., Nashville, (with local contractor), NRHP-listed
Tennessee Supreme Court Building, 401 Seventh Avenue North, Nashville, built in 1937 by Rock City Construction; NRHP-listed
Union City Armory, 415 W. Main St., Union City, Tennessee,  NRHP-listed
United States Post Office (Nashville, Tennessee), 901 Broadway, Nashville, NRHP-listed
One or more works in Tennessee School for the Deaf Historic District, 2725 Island Home Blvd. Knoxville, Tennessee, NRHP-listed
One or more works in Fifth Avenue Historic District, Roughly bounded by Church and Union Sts., 4th, 5th, and 6th Aves., Nashville, NRHP-listed
One or more works in Tennessee State University Historic District, 3500 John A. Merritt Blvd., Nashville, (Marr & Holman, et al.), NRHP-listed

References

Architecture firms based in Tennessee
Companies based in Nashville, Tennessee